Konstantinos Poulios (born 19 September 1977) is a Greek long-distance runner. He was born in Athens and originates from Trikala. He competed in the marathon at the 2012 Summer Olympics in London, finishing in the 80th place with 2:33:17.

References

1977 births
Living people
Athletes from Athens
Greek male long-distance runners
Athletes (track and field) at the 2012 Summer Olympics
Olympic athletes of Greece
Panathinaikos Athletics